Events from the year 1974 in Iran.

Incumbents
 Shah: Mohammad Reza Pahlavi 
 Prime Minister: Amir-Abbas Hoveida

Events

Births

 17 January – Ladan and Laleh Bijani, conjoined twin sisters (d. 2003)

Deaths

 25 February – Hossein Tehrani.

See also
 Years in Iraq
 Years in Afghanistan

References

 
Iran
Years of the 20th century in Iran
1970s in Iran
Iran